Korchazhinskaya is a rural locality (a village) in Tarnogskoye Rural Settlement, Tarnogsky District, Vologda Oblast, Russia. The population was 45 as of 2002.

Geography 
Korchazhinskaya is located 16 km northeast of Tarnogsky Gorodok (the district's administrative centre) by road. Shalimovskaya is the nearest rural locality.

References 

Rural localities in Tarnogsky District